Bloodline most commonly refers to heredity.

Bloodline, bloodlines, blood line or blood lines may also refer to:

Arts, entertainment, and media

Comics
 Bloodlines (comics), a 1993 DC Comics crossover
 Colossus: Bloodline, a 2006 Marvel Comics miniseries about the X-Man Colossus
 Bloodlines, a 2004 issue of the Star Wars: Republic comic book series
 Bloodlines, a 2007 collection of Hellblazer stories written by Garth Ennis

Films  
 Bloodline (1963 film), a Korean film, based on a 1948 play
 Bloodline (1979 film), a film based on Sidney Sheldon's novel (see below), directed by Terence Young
 Bloodline (2008 film), a documentary film by Bruce Burgess
 Bloodline (2011 film), a film by Matt Thompson
 Bloodline (2018 film), a horror/thriller film by Henry Jacobson
 Bloodlines, a 2004 film starring Rudolf Martin 
 Hellraiser: Bloodline, a 1996 horror film in the Hellraiser series
 Day of the Dead: Bloodline, a 2018 horror film in the Day of the Dead Series

Games 
 Assassin's Creed: Bloodlines, a 2009 PSP game set after the first Assassin's Creed game
 Castlevania: Bloodlines, a 1994 Castlevania video game
 Vampire: The Masquerade – Bloodlines, a 2004 computer game based on the World of Darkness setting by White Wolf
 Blood Lines, a 1999 PlayStation game developed by Radical Entertainment
 Bloodline, a version of the Blood Gulch multiplayer map in Halo: The Master Chief Collection

Literature 
 Blood Line, a 2011 novel by Lynda La Plante
Blood Lines (short story collection), a 1995 collection by Ruth Rendell
 Blood Lines (Wilks novel), a 2007 World of the Lupi novel by Eileen Wilks
Blood Lines, a 1992 novel by Tanya Huff
 Blood Lines, a 2016 novel by Angela Marsons
 Bloodline (Cary novel), a 2005 unofficial sequel to Bram Stoker's Dracula, by Kate Cary
 Bloodline (Sheldon novel), a 1977 novel by Sidney Sheldon
 Bloodline (Wilson novel), a 2007 sci-fi novel by F. Paul Wilson
 Bloodline, a 1999 play co-written and -produced by Dmitry Chepovetsky
 Bloodline, a 2004 novel by Kevin Brooks
 Bloodline (Rollins novel), a 2012 novel by James Rollins
 Bloodlines (Deathlands novel), a 1995 Deathlands novel
 Bloodlines (book series), by Richelle Mead
 Bloodlines (Mead novel), 2011
 Bloodlines (Star Wars novel), a 2006 novel by Karen Traviss in the Legacy of the Force series
 Bloodlines, a 2000 novel by Fred D'Aguiar
 Bloodlines, a 2005 novel by Jan Burke 
 Bloodlines: The Story of Urza's Destiny, a 1999 novel in the Artifacts Cycle by Loren Coleman
Star Wars: Bloodline, 2016 novel by Claudia Gray
 The Blood Line, by Tom French

Music

Groups and labels
 Bloodline (band), an American blues rock band
 Bloodline, the name of Kenny Rogers backing band since 1976
 Bloodline Records, an American hip hop label founded by DMX
 The Bloodline (band), an American metalcore band, previously known as Dirge Within

Albums  

 Bloodline (Glen Campbell album), 1976
 Bloodline (Kenny Neal album), 2016
 Bloodline (LeVert album), 1986
 Bloodline (Recoil album), 1992
 Bloodlines (Alex Faith album), 2015
 Bloodlines (Howl album), 2013
 Bloodlines (Midnight Syndicate album), 2021
 Bloodlines (Terry Allen album), 1983; reissued on Smokin' the Dummy/Bloodlines compilation
 Bloodlines, by Kev Carmody, 1993

Songs
 "Bloodline" (song), by Ariana Grande, 2019
 "Bloodline", by Northlane from Alien, 2019
 "Bloodline", by Roam from Backbone, 2016
 "Bloodline", by Slayer from God Hates Us All, 2001
 "Bloodlines", by Dethklok from Dethalbum II, 2009
 "Bloodlines", by Tim and the Glory Boys, 2021
 "Blood Lines", by Sleeping with Sirens from How It Feels to Be Lost, 2019

Television

Series
 Bloodline (TV series), a 2015 Netflix thriller-drama series
 Bloodlines (ITV drama), a 2005 two-episode British detective fiction thriller
 The Challenge: Battle of the Bloodlines, season 27 of the MTV reality game show

Episodes
 "Bloodline" (CSI: Miami)
 "Bloodline" (ER)
 "Bloodline" (Fringe)
 "Bloodlines" (All Saints)
 "Bloodlines" (Blade: The Series)
 "Bloodlines" (CSI: Crime Scene Investigation)
 "Bloodlines" (Silent Witness)
 "Bloodlines" (Star Trek: The Next Generation)
 "Bloodlines" (Stargate SG-1)
 "Bloodlines" (The Vampire Diaries)
 "Bloodlines" (Voltron: Legendary Defender)
 "Bloodlines" (X-Men)
 "Blood Lines" (Lost Girl)
 "The Blood Line" (Torchwood)

Sports
 The Bloodline (professional wrestling), a professional wrestling stable in WWE